"Sing for Absolution" is a song by English rock band Muse, serving as the title track for their third studio album, Absolution. It was released in May 2004 as the fourth single from that album, peaking at number 16 in the UK Singles Chart. The song also appears on the Absolution Tour DVD. A live acoustic version of the song serves as a B-side for the "Butterflies and Hurricanes" single.

Background
"Sing for Absolution" is composed in the key of D minor, and moves at a slow tempo of 86 bpm. The song's vocal range spans from G3 to A4. When performed live, the song is transposed down half a step, into C sharp minor. The song was performed at most shows from 2003 to 2004 and occasionally in 2007. The song has not been performed since 2017.

Drummer Dominic Howard has said that the song is about finding absolution through singing and writing music, Dom said: The song "Sing For Absolution" is about the music writing and making music. This can also be a kind of absolution, but not in the religious sense intentioned. Absolution may mean that you will find an absoluteness or something positive. Through things you might not quite understand, or things that are strange or confusing things that you look at first as a negative singing, in other word, making music can be a way to understand these things. To pack in a context that makes them understandable.

Video
This video was produced by ARK of Sheffield, UK, and released in May 2004. It depicts a populated civilised planet, probably a New Earth on which humans have settled. The camera's POV begins with a city, possibly London, firing missiles off-camera. As the camera pans left, the viewer can see massive walls of ice that suggest the leading edge of an encroaching glacier. This is the apparent target for the weapons. Muse is then shown to be on a very large, futuristic rocketship launching into space. Leaving the atmosphere, they pass by space debris and an enormous video screen which features a beautiful, coyly smiling woman along with the message, "Be prepared... the ice age is coming".

Muse's rocket then docks with a 'Cryo Module' that is housing hundreds of people in a state of cryogenic suspension, which is revealed in the extended version of the video. It could be speculated that Muse's mission is to populate their destination planet. The spacecraft and its attached module enter a hyperdrive-like wormhole. The ship eventually exits into an asteroid field above an orange planet. The pilot (Bellamy) steers the ship to avoid colliding with the asteroids but ends up failing to completely avoid an especially large one. The cryo module collides with it, damaging the docking collar and sending them somewhat out of control. The cryo module is detached, and the spacecraft gains speed as it enters the orange planet's atmosphere. The brakes on the ship fail, and they crash, sliding a very large distance from the incredible speed. Muse is next seen standing on a cliff, looking out over a large landscape. As the camera zooms out, the Houses of Parliament and Big Ben in London can be seen, completely in ruin buried beneath large collections of dirt and sand. It can be speculated that they are the last remaining survivors on the planet, however, the final shot of the detached Cryo Module drifting in space implies that the last surviving humans are actually those left frozen inside, ending the video on a darkly ironic note.

Track listing

7" EW285, CD EW285CD
"Sing for Absolution" (full length US remix) – 5:01
"Fury" – 4:59
Previously released on the Japanese version of Absolution as a bonus track.
DVD EW285DVD
"Sing for Absolution" (video)
"Sing for Absolution" (audio)
"Sing for Absolution" (making of the video)
"Big Day Off" (video)
Artwork Gallery of the band

Charts

Weekly charts

Year-end charts

References

External links
Muse – official website.

Muse (band) songs
Rock ballads
2004 singles
Song recordings produced by Rich Costey
2003 songs
Songs written by Matt Bellamy
East West Records singles
Songs written by Dominic Howard
Songs written by Chris Wolstenholme